Andis is a variant of Andes, a personal name popular among the Illyrians inhabiting the territory of what is now Bosnia and Herzegovina, more specifically the southern parts of ancient province of Pannonia and much of the northern parts of ancient Dalmatia. Due to this particular geographic distribution, the origin and the meaning of Andes may be connected to the name origin of Andizetes, a small Illyrian community whose home was precisely present day Bosnia and Herzegovina.

Due to a widespread distribution of names like Andio, Andena, Andinus, found throughout the entire territory inhabited by ancient Illyrians, we can presume that the pertinent root word is "and-".  

"Andes" resembles and sounds like some ancient Greek name, with the word ending of "-es", as opposed to names with more typically Illyrian name endings, -o, and -on, such as that found in a more Illyrian-sounding variant Andio, found too throughout the Illyrian territories, but predominantly in Bosnia and Herzegovina. However, coincidentally or not, "Andes" literally represents an Albanian Dative case of  "Anda" (Albanian  Dative case for nouns ending in "-a" end with suffix "-es";e.g. Nominative case - Anda; Dative case - Andes;  Nom. - Plaka; Dat. - Plakes etc.). However, if "Andes" were an Albanian name, then it is most likely to represent the Genitive case (English = "of Anda, or "belonging to Anda"; "Albanian -i Andes",  with  prefix "-i" diminished in the name) and not the Dative, given that names and surnames traditionally and technically represent the Genitive case, also known as Possessive case or Second case ( e.g. "O'Connor"= "of Connor", "Johnson"= "Son of John" etc.).

Indeed, the closest corresponding word (and a possible cognate) is the Proto-Albanian word Anda, meaning "a strong desire", from which a modern Albanian word of "Andja" ("desire", "wish" or "lust") is believed to derive. 

However, other etymological explanations should be considered, given the fact that further scientific enquiry should be carried out before reaching a tangible conclusion pertaining to the etymology of Illyrian names and Illyrian language in general.  

Female versions of the name include Andia and Andena.

The name of ancient Celtic god, Andinus (Deo Andino sacrum) is yet another word that has been related to this personal name.

The name is also used in Latvia, as a short form of Andris or Andrejs, both Latvian forms of Andrew. The female forms are Anda and Andra.

References

Ancient tribes in Bosnia and Herzegovina